The PL/M programming language 
(an acronym of Programming Language for Microcomputers)
is a high-level language conceived and developed by 
Gary Kildall in 1973 for Hank Smith at Intel for its microprocessors.

Overview
The language incorporated ideas from PL/I, ALGOL and XPL, and had an integrated macro processor. As a graduate of the University of Washington Kildall had used their Burroughs B5500 computer, and as such was aware of the potential of high-level languages such as ESPOL for systems programming.

Unlike other contemporary languages such as Pascal, C or BASIC, PL/M had no standard input or output routines. It included features targeted at the low-level hardware specific to the target microprocessors, and as such, it could support direct access to any location in memory, I/O ports and the processor interrupt flags in a very efficient manner. PL/M was the first higher level programming language for microprocessor-based computers and was the original implementation language for those parts of the CP/M operating system which were not written in assembler. Many Intel and Zilog Z80-based embedded systems were programmed in PL/M during the 1970s and 1980s. For instance, the firmware of the Service Processor component of CISC IBM AS/400 was written in PL/M.

The original PL/M compiler targeted the Intel 8008. An updated version (PL/M-80) generated code for the 8080 processor, which would also run on the newer Intel 8085 as well as on the Zilog Z80 family (as it is backward-compatible with the 8080). Later followed compilers for the Intel 8048 and Intel 8051-microcontroller family (PL/M-51) as well as for the 8086 (8088) (PL/M-86), 80186 (80188) and subsequent 8086-based processors, including the advanced 80286 and the 32-bit 80386. There were also PL/M compilers developed for later microcontrollers, such as the Intel 8061 and 8096 / MCS-96 architecture family (PL/M-96).

While some PL/M compilers were "native", meaning that they ran on systems using that same microprocessor, e.g. for the Intel ISIS operating system, there were also cross compilers, for instance PLMX, which ran on other operating environments such as Digital Research CP/M, Microsoft's DOS, and Digital Equipment Corporation's VAX/VMS.

PL/M is no longer supported by Intel, but aftermarket tools like PL/M-to-C source-code translators exist.

PL/M sample code
FIND: PROCEDURE(PA,PB) BYTE;
    DECLARE (PA,PB) BYTE;
    /* FIND THE STRING IN SCRATCH STARTING AT PA AND ENDING AT PB */
    DECLARE J ADDRESS,
        (K, MATCH) BYTE;
    J = BACK ;
    MATCH = FALSE;
        DO WHILE NOT MATCH AND (MAXM > J);
        LAST,J = J + 1; /* START SCAN AT J */
        K = PA ; /* ATTEMPT STRING MATCH AT K */
            DO WHILE SCRATCH(K) = MEMORY(LAST) AND
                NOT (MATCH := K = PB);
            /* MATCHED ONE MORE CHARACTER */
            K = K + 1; LAST = LAST + 1;
            END;
        END;
    IF MATCH THEN /* MOVE STORAGE */
        DO; LAST = LAST - 1; CALL MOVER;
        END;
    RETURN MATCH;
    END FIND;

References

Further reading
 
 
  (NB. Includes entire syntax of PL/M in BNF notation.)
 

Digital Research languages
PL/I programming language family
Procedural programming languages
Programming languages
Programming languages created in 1972
Structured programming languages